Douglas Tuber and Tim Maile are an American television writing and producing duo. Their credits include Herman's Head, All American Girl, Smart Guy, Jessie, Salute Your Shorts and Lizzie McGuire, as well as creating Phil of the Future and Darcy's Wild Life.

Credits
Mira, Royal Detective (writers, 1 episode, 2020)
Littlest Pet Shop: A World of Our Own (producers, story editors, writers, 10 episodes, 2018)
Sonic Boom (writers, 1 episode, 2015)
Jessie (consulting producers, writers, 2011–2012)
Famous 5: On the Case (writers, creative producers, 28 episodes, 2008)
Darcy's Wild Life (creators, writers, executive producers, 2004)
Phil of the Future (creators, writers, executive producers, 14 episodes, 2004–2006)
Lizzie McGuire (writers, executive producers, consulting producers, 37 episodes, 2001–2004)
Family Affair (executive producers, 2002)
Smart Guy (writers, 6 episodes, 1997–1999)
Life's Work (writers, producers, 1996–1997)
All American Girl (writers, producers, 16 episodes, 1994–1995)
Herman's Head (writers, 1993–1994)
Woops! (writers, 1 episode, 1992)
Salute Your Shorts (writers, 9 episodes, 1991–1992)

References

External links

American television producers
American television writers
American male television writers
Living people
Screenwriting duos
Place of birth missing (living people)
Year of birth missing (living people)